LRT Uijeongbu Station is a station of the U Line in Uijeongbu-dong, Uijeongbu, Gyeonggi-do, South Korea. The station is unrelated to the Uijeongbu Station of Korail.

Station layout

External links
  Station information from Uijeongbu Light Rail Transit Co., Ltd

Seoul Metropolitan Subway stations
Metro stations in Uijeongbu
Railway stations opened in 2012